Rupp or RUPP can refer to:

 Rational Unified Process Product
 Royal University of Phnom Penh
 Roads used as public paths,
 Rights of way in England and Wales
 Rights of way in Scotland
 Warren Rupp Observatory
 Rupp Industries, a Mansfield, Ohio producer of go-karts, mini-bikes, and snowmobiles from the late 1950s until 1978; founded by car racer Mickey Rupp

People called Rupp or Ruppe:

 Adolph Rupp (1901–1977), an American basketball coach
 Adolph Rupp Trophy, an American basketball trophy
 Rupp Arena, an American basketball arena
 Bernd Rupp (b. 1942), a German football player 
 Debra Jo Rupp (b. 1951), an American television actress
 Duane Rupp (b. 1938), a Canadian ice hockey player
 Ernest Gordon Rupp (1910–1986), a British preacher and historian
 Ernst Rupp (1892-1943) Wehrmacht General 
 Galen Rupp (b. 1986), an American athlete
 George Erik Rupp (b. 1942), an American educator and theologian
 Hans Georg Rupp (1907-1989), German judge
 Heinrich Bernhard Rupp (1688-1719), a German botanist
 Herman Rupp (1872–1956), an Australian clergyman and botanist
 James H. Rupp (1918-1998), an American politician and businessman
 Jean Rupp (1905–1983), French bishop and Vatican diplomat 
 Jennifer Rupp (b. 1980), materials engineer
 Kerry Rupp, an American basketball coach
 Leila J. Rupp (b. 1950), an American historian and feminist
 Loret Miller Ruppe (1936–1996), an American administrator and diplomat
 Lukas Rupp (born 1991), German footballer
 Michael Rupp (b. 1980), an American ice hockey player
 Mickey Rupp (b. 1936), an American racecar driver
 Pat Rupp (1942–2006), an American ice hockey player
 Philip Ruppe (b. 1926), an American politician
 Rainer Rupp (b. 1945), East German spy
 Scott T. Rupp, an American politician
 Sieghardt Rupp (1931–2015), an Austrian actor
 Terry Rupp (born 1966), an American college baseball coach

Surnames from given names